Icaro is a South American indigenous colloquialism for magic song. Today, this term is commonly used to describe the medicine songs performed in vegetal ceremonies, especially by shamans in ayahuasca ceremonies. It is also commonly used to describe a traditional artisanal pattern of the Shipibo tribe based on the visions induced by ayahuasca.

Etymology 

The word icaro is believed to derive from the Quechua verb ikaray, which means "to blow smoke in order to heal".

In healing ceremonies

Medicine songs 

Icaro is most commonly used to describe the medicine songs used by shamans in healing ceremonies, such as with the psychedelic brew ayahuasca. Traditionally, these songs can be performed by whistling, singing with the voice or vocables, or playing an instrument such as the didgeridoo or flute.

Traditionally, icaros may come to a shaman during a ceremony, be passed down from previous lineages of healers, or come to a shaman during a 'dieta' where plant spirits are believed to teach icaros to the shaman directly. The singing or whistling of icaros is sometimes accompanied by a chakapa, a rattle of bundled leaves. Due to the complexity of certain performance techniques, it may take many years to learn certain icaros, and experienced shamans may be able to recite hundreds of them.

References

External links
 

Peruvian songs
Peruvian music
Shamanism of the Americas
Cultural heritage of Peru